Cesare Luigi Musatti (21 September 1897 - 21 March 1989) was an Italian philosopher and psychoanalyst. He was a leading figure for the first generation of Italian psychoanalysts. Musatti studied under Vittorio Benussi before becoming his assistant.
Musatti edited the Italian edition of the works of Sigmund Freud.

Selected works
 Trattato di psicoanalisi, Paolo Boringhieri, Torino

References

1897 births
1989 deaths
Italian psychoanalysts
People from Dolo